A Brand New Life is a 1973 American made-for-television drama film directed by Sam O'Steen. It stars Cloris Leachman and Martin Balsam. Leachman won the Primetime Emmy Award for Outstanding Single Performance by an Actress in a Leading Role for her performance.

Plot
A middle-aged couple faces the impending birth of their first child.

Cast
Cloris Leachman as Victoria Douglas
Martin Balsam as Jim Douglas
Marge Redmond as Eleanor
Gene Nelson as Harry
Mildred Dunnock as Mother
Wilfred Hyde-White as Mr. Berger
Barbara Colby as Jessica Hiller

Release
The movie debuted on ABC on February 20, 1973 as the "ABC Tuesday Movie of the Week".  It was the ninth-most viewed primetime offering of the week in the United States, with a 23.6 rating.  It received positive reviews, with Howard Thompson of The New York Times stating, "most made-for-TV movies emerge like assembly-line lard, but "A Brand New Life" is a joy," and calling it "literate, moving, amusing and genuinely sophisticated in its quiet, observant wisdom."

See also
 List of American films of 1973

References

External links

Movie on Youtube

1973 television films
1973 films
1973 drama films
1970s American films
1970s English-language films
ABC Movie of the Week
American drama television films
Films directed by Sam O'Steen
Films scored by Billy Goldenberg